Futebol Clube de Tigres de Fronteira is a Guinea-Bissauan football club based in São Domingos. They currently play in the top domestic Campeonato Nacional da Guiné-Bissau.

References

Tigres de Fronteira